Scrophularia scorodonia is a species of flowering plant in the figwort family (Scrophulariaceae).

It is native to western and southwestern Europe, Northwest Morocco and the Azores and Madeira islands.

References

scorodonia
Flora of Portugal